Garra fuliginosa is a species of ray-finned fish in the genus Garra. It is native to fast flowing water in large Indochinese rivers.

References 

Garra
Fish described in 1934